The Nation's Cup Score Women in the 2019–20 Biathlon World Cup is led by Norway, whom is the defending titlist. Each nation's score comprises the points earned by its three best placed athletes in every Sprint and Individual competition, the points earned in the Women's Relay competitions, and half of the points earned in the Mixed Relay competitions.

2018–19 Top 3 standings

Standings

References

External links
Women's Nation Cup Score

Nation